A Fairly Odd Christmas (also known as A Fairly Odd Movie 2) is a 2012 live-action/animated Christmas comedy television film. It is the sequel to the 2011 live-action TV film A Fairly Odd Movie: Grow Up, Timmy Turner! and the second live-action adaptation of the Nickelodeon animated television series The Fairly OddParents.

The film was first announced on March 14, 2012. The film premiered on Nickelodeon on November 29, 2012, to 4.473 million viewers.

The film was released on Region 1 DVD on December 17, 2013, and was released on Blu-ray on December 4, 2015.

Plot

Timmy Turner (Drake Bell), his fairies (Cosmo, Wanda, and Poof), and Tootie (Daniella Monet) have been traveling around the world, granting wishes for others.

A few days before Christmas, Santa Claus and the elves check who is naughty and whois nice, only to discover that people's names are being removed from the nice list as a result of Timmy granting them wishes. Two elves, Christmas Carol and Dingle Dave, escort Timmy, his fairies, and Tootie to a meeting with Santa at his workshop, who explains that Timmy should stop granting wishes since with great power, comes great responsibility (a reference to Spider-Man whom Drake Bell voiced at the time). Just then, an elf tells him that the gift wrapping machine is broken. When Santa wishes for it to be fixed, Timmy decides to grant it. However, since fairy magic does not work in "an elf-made building", the magic instead turns into a blast that causes Santa to fall into the machine and hit his head; resulting in him getting amnesia and acting like the Easter Bunny among other things. As a result of a lack of Christmas spirit, the workshop malfunctions and shuts down.

Jorgen Von Strangle arrives and tells Timmy that he must reprise the role of Santa, since the rules state a godchild must take over the role of a holiday icon if the godchild has harmed them to the extent that they cannot do their job. However, an elf explains that Timmy cannot be Santa since he is on the naughty list, and Cosmo, Wanda, Poof, and Jorgen cannot change that since Earth's magnetic polarity at the North Pole nullifies fairy magic. The elves explain that to get his name off the naughty list, he must speak to Elmer the Elder Elf. They explain that it is a very dangerous path and that he may not make it out alive. Timmy then insists to go alone, since this is his problem, however, Tootie, the fairies, two elves, and even Mr. Crocker (who came in an attempt to get his name off the naughty list) decide to tag along.

The journey proves to be difficult, especially when the elves lose the path to Elmer. As they continue, Timmy and Crocker are separated from the others by a snowstorm. Tootie, the fairies and the elves come across a penguin, who guides them to a bridge leading them to Elmer. Meanwhile, Timmy and Crocker come across a group of gingerbread men named GingerFred, GingerEd, GingerNed and GingerJed, who are willing to help them. Just then, a starving Crocker bites off GingerJed's head, enraging the gingerbread men who chase the two away. The two eventually reach the other five and they escape and camp for the night. The following day, they come across the bridge, which is heavily damaged. The fairies help the others over, however, the still vengeful gingerbread men come, and in an attempt to get Crocker over, Timmy falls down, but manages to escape unscathed using candy canes given to him earlier by Santa.

Upon arriving at Elmer's house, Timmy asks Elmer why he is on the naughty list when he has been granting wishes for others. Elmer explains that with his fairies granting wishes for others, the wishes are causing more bad than good, supported by a series of clips presented by Elmer. Having proven his point, Elmer refuses to take Timmy's name off the naughty list, leaving Timmy and the others upset that they could not fix Christmas. However, Crocker opens up to Timmy and explains that he respects him for having the courage to risk his life for Christmas. Overhearing this, and surprised that Timmy was able to even warm Crocker's heart, Elmer changes his mind and takes Timmy's name off the naughty list.

Timmy and the others then take Elmer's vehicle to get back to the workshop, but realize that without Christmas spirit, the evil Winter Warlock (negativity and depression) has covered the whole planet. The elves explain that Timmy has a very small chance of saving Christmas now that Winter Warlock has blocked the path out of the North Pole. Timmy quickly puts on Santa's clothing, restoring power to the workshop, and gives orders to everyone else to prepare all the gifts. When they are ready, they find that all of the reindeer are missing (as Crocker unintentionally released all of them in an attempt to stay hidden). Using the magic van as a substitute, they barely manage to make it through Winter Warlock's Wrath and give all the presents to everyone.

On Christmas Day, Santa regains his memory and realizes that Timmy has saved Christmas. After Santa gets back into his clothes, they all party. Despite not getting off the naughty list, Crocker gets his first-ever Christmas present (a new tie that looks exactly like the one he already has, which he loves) and Timmy and Tootie kiss under the mistletoe. Poof then flies up to the screen and says "God bless us, everyone." Wanda then assures the audience that no fairies were harmed in the making of this movie, but Cosmo says he got a paper cut. The film ends with Mr. Turner finally getting a pony who poops ice cream.

Cast

 Drake Bell as Timmy Turner
 Daniella Monet as Tootie
 David Lewis as Denzel Crocker
 Daran Norris as Cosmo (voice), Mr. Turner
 Susanne Blakeslee as Wanda (voice)
 Tara Strong as Poof (voice)
 Teryl Rothery as Mrs. Turner
 Mark Gibbon as Jorgen Von Strangle
 Travis Turner as Dingle Dave
 Devyn Dalton as Christmas Carol
 Tony Cox as Elmer the Elder Elf
 Devon Weigel as Vicky
 Donavon Stinson as Santa Claus
 Dalila Bela as Jingle Jill
 Olivia Steele-Falconer as Katie
 Butch Hartman as Christmas Caroler, GingerFred, GingerEd, GingerNed and GingerJed

Production 
Twenty days after the premiere of A Fairly Odd Movie: Grow Up, Timmy Turner! on Nickelodeon, The Fairly OddParents creator and film writer Butch Hartman tweeted that he was working on ideas for a sequel to Grow Up, Timmy Turner! On March 14, 2012, during Nickelodeon's 2012-2013 Upfront, the aforementioned sequel film was announced.

A Fairly Odd Christmas was filmed in Vancouver, British Columbia, Canada, from March 23 to April 18, 2012. On November 8, Columbia Records and Nickelodeon announced the release of the holiday album Merry Nickmas; the album includes a recording of "Santa Claus is Coming to Town", by Rachel Crow, which would be featured in A Fairly Odd Christmas. On November 9, TV Guide officially announced that the film would premiere on November 30 and released its first trailer. However, on November 16, Nickelodeon changed the premiere date to November 29, and Nickelodeon's official website for the film released a trailer announcing the new airdate. On November 16, Nickelodeon stated, via Twitter, that they would air the film again on November 30.

Reception 
On November 29, 2012, A Fairly Odd Christmas received 4.47 million and a 0.9 rating on 18–49.

Accolades

Sequel
In 2013, it was announced there would be a third and final installment, titled A Fairly Odd Summer, with Drake Bell and Daniella Monet reprising their roles. The film aired on August 2, 2014.

See also 
 List of Christmas films

References

External links

 
 Official site at Nick.com

2012 television films
2012 films
American children's comedy films
American Christmas comedy films
American fantasy comedy films
Canadian Christmas comedy films
Canadian fantasy comedy films
The Fairly OddParents films
Films directed by Savage Steve Holland
Films shot in Vancouver
American films with live action and animation
Live-action films based on animated series
Nickelodeon original films
Television sequel films
2010s Christmas comedy films
2010s children's comedy films
2010s fantasy comedy films
Films with screenplays by Savage Steve Holland
Films scored by Guy Moon
2010s English-language films
2010s American films
2010s Canadian films
Santa Claus in film